Com'è profondo il mare ("How deep is the sea") is an album by Italian singer-songwriter Lucio Dalla, released in 1977 by RCA Italiana. It was the first work in which Dalla wrote both the music and lyrics, after three albums in which the latter had been provided by poet Roberto Roversi.

Track listing
"Come è profondo il mare" - 5:24
"Treno a vela" - 3:27
"Il cucciolo Alfredo" - 5:22
"Corso Buenos Aires" - 4:38
"Disperato erotico stomp" - 5:52
"Quale allegria" - 4:30
"...E non andar più via" - 3:25
"Barcarola" - 3:50

1977 albums
Lucio Dalla albums
Italian-language albums